Mimacraea gelinia is a butterfly in the family Lycaenidae. It is found in Tanzania. The habitat consists of forests.

Adults of subspecies M. g. nguru resemble day-flying geometrid moths of the genus Scopula.

Subspecies
 Mimacraea gelinia gelinia (Tanzania: north-east to Usambara)
 Mimacraea gelinia nguru Kielland, 1986 (Tanzania: Nguru mountains)

References

Endemic fauna of Tanzania
Butterflies described in 1893
Poritiinae
Butterflies of Africa
Taxa named by Charles Oberthür